Chemseddine Nessakh (born January 4, 1988 in Oran) is an Algerian footballer who plays for ASO Chlef in the Algerian Ligue Professionnelle 1 and the Algeria national team.

Club career
On February 18, 2009, Nessakh was chosen as the best ASM Oran player for the first half of the 2008–09 Algerian Championnat National 2 season by the club's fans.

JS Kabylie
On December 26, 2009, Nessakh signed a two and a half year contract with JS Kabylie, joining them on a transfer from ASM Oran. The transfer fee was not disclosed. In his first season with the club, he made 11 league appearances, 4 of them as a starter. He also played an important role in JS Kabylie's run to the semi-finals of the 2010 CAF Champions League, playing in all of the team's group stage games, as well as their two semi-final matches against TP Mazembe.

On March 19, 2011, Nessakh scored the only goal in JS Kabylie's 1-0 win over ASC Tevragh-Zeïna in the first round of the 2011 CAF Confederation Cup. In the second leg in Mauritania, he scored another two goals to help JS Kabylie qualify 3-1 on aggregate to the second round.

Honours
 Won the Algerian Cup once with JS Kabylie in 2010–11 Algerian Cup

References

External links
 

1988 births
Living people
Algeria international footballers
Algerian footballers
Footballers from Oran
ASM Oran players
JS Kabylie players
ASO Chlef players
MC Oran players
ES Sétif players
Algerian Ligue Professionnelle 1 players
Association football defenders
21st-century Algerian people